Maryna Vlasenko (born 6 October 1987) is a Ukrainian handballer player for HC Astrakhanochka and the Ukrainian national team.

References

1987 births
Living people
Ukrainian female handball players